There have been two Battles of Burton Bridge, both fought over the medieval bridge at Burton upon Trent:

Battle of Burton Bridge (1322) - a victory for King Edward II over the rebellious Earl of Lancaster
Battle of Burton Bridge (1643) - a victory for the Royalists in the First English Civil War